Oonops tubulatus is a spider species found in Portugal and Algeria.

See also 
 List of Oonopidae species

References

External links 

Oonopidae
Spiders of Europe
Spiders of Africa
Invertebrates of North Africa
Spiders described in 1916